French Township is one of twelve townships in Adams County, Indiana. As of the 2010 census, its population was 1,083.

Geography

Adjacent townships
 Kirkland Township (north)
 Washington Township (northeast)
 Monroe Township (east)
 Wabash Township (southeast)
 Hartford Township (south)
 Harrison Township, Wells County (west)

Major highways

Cemeteries
The township contains these cemeteries: Biberstein (Moser), Evangelical Mennonite (also known as Defenseless Mennonite or Égly), French (Reynolds), Huser Family, and Moser Family.

Rivers
 Wabash River

School districts
 Adams Central Community Schools
 South Adams Schools

Political districts
 Indiana's 6th congressional district
 State House District 79
 State Senate District 19

References
 
 United States Census Bureau 2007 TIGER/Line Shapefiles
 United States National Atlas

External links
 Indiana Township Association
 United Township Association of Indiana

Townships in Adams County, Indiana
Townships in Indiana